The 1937 Utah Utes football team was an American football team that represented the University of Utah as a member of the Rocky Mountain Conference (RMC) during the 1937 college football season. In their 13th season under head coach Ike Armstrong, the Utes compiled an overall record of 5–3 with a mark of 5–2 in conference play, tied for second place in the RMC, and outscored all opponents by a total of 133 to 52.

Schedule

After the season

NFL Draft
Two players were selected in the 1938 NFL Draft.

References

Utah
Utah Utes football seasons
Utah Utes football